Copăceni is a commune in Ilfov County, Muntenia, Romania, established in 2005 when it was split off from 1 Decembrie. It is composed of a single village, Copăceni.

References

Communes in Ilfov County
Localities in Muntenia